Al Maarif is an Arabic daily newspaper that has been published in Egypt since 1963.

History and profile
Al Maarif was established in 1963. The paper is one of the state-owned publications in the country.

See also
 List of newspapers in Egypt

References

1963 establishments in Egypt
Arabic-language newspapers
Daily newspapers published in Egypt
Newspapers established in 1963
State media
Newspapers published in Cairo